The Arakawa River is a river that flows through Yamagata and Niigata prefectures in northern Japan. Its source is O-Asahidake, within the Bandai-Asahi National Park in Oguni Town, Yamagata. it flows in an approximately southwesterly direction for  before discharging into the Sea of Japan at Momozakihama in the city of Tainai, Niigata. Its tributaries include the Yokogawa and Onagawa in Yamagata and Sekigawa in Niigata. It covers a total of 1,150km2 and has been classified as a "first-class river" by the Japanese Ministry of Land, Infrastructure, Transport and Tourism as being important to commerce.

References

Rivers of Niigata Prefecture
Rivers of Yamagata Prefecture
Rivers of Japan